Ectobius lapponicus, also known as the dusky cockroach, is a species of cockroach found in Europe, northern Asia (excluding China), the northeastern United States, and southeastern Canada.

Distribution
The distribution range of Ectobius lapponicus includes Europe, Northern Asia (excluding China), the northeastern United States, and southeastern Canada. Once thought native to Europe recent discoveries indicate the genus originated in North America. The first recorded sightings in North America were in 1984.

Gallery

References

Further reading

 American Insects: A Handbook of the Insects of America North of Mexico, Ross H. Arnett. 2000. CRC Press.
 Atkinson, Thomas H., Philip G. Koehler, and Richard S. Patterson (1991). Catalog and Atlas of the Cockroaches of North America North of Mexico. Miscellaneous Publications of the Entomological Society of America, no. 78, 1-85.
 Poole, Robert W., and Patricia Gentili, eds. (1997). Blattodea. Nomina Insecta Nearctica: A Check List of the Insects of North America: vol. 4: Non-Holometabolous Orders, 31-39.
 Princis, K. / Beier, M., ed. (1971). Blattariae: Subordo Epilamproidea Fam.: Ectobiidae. Orthopterorum Catalogus, pars 14, 1039-1224.

External links

NCBI Taxonomy Browser, Ectobius lapponicus

Cockroaches
Insects of Europe
Cockroaches described in 1758
Taxa named by Carl Linnaeus